The 2021 Seattle mayoral election was held on November 2, 2021, to elect the Mayor of Seattle. It was won by former Seattle City Council President Bruce Harrell, who defeated then-current President Lorena González; both candidates had advanced from a nonpartisan primary election on August 3.

Incumbent mayor Jenny Durkan initially sought reelection to a second term in office in February 2020, but withdrew that December due to backlash from her handling of the economic fallout from the COVID-19 pandemic in Seattle as well as the Capitol Hill Occupied Protest during the George Floyd protests.

Harrell held a 24-point lead over González when she conceded on November 4; his margin of victory was the largest of a non-incumbent candidate in a Seattle mayoral race since the 1969 election of Wesley C. Uhlman. Harrell took over as mayor on January 1, 2022, having previously held the position as acting mayor for five days in September 2017 upon the resignation of Ed Murray; due to a spike in COVID-19 cases, he was sworn in privately the prior week and held a small inauguration ceremony on January 4.

The 2021 election was the first in which mayoral candidates were eligible to use Seattle's democracy vouchers program, which has captured the interest of other cities.

Primary election

Candidates

Declared
Clinton Bliss, medical doctor and small business owner
Henry Dennison, rail worker and candidate for Governor in 2020
James Donaldson, activist, former Seattle SuperSonics player, and candidate for mayor in 2009
Colleen Echohawk, executive director of the Chief Seattle Club
Jessyn Farrell, state representative for the 46th district (2013–2017), candidate for mayor in 2017
Lorena González, president of the Seattle City Council (2020–present), at-large city council-member (2015–present)
Bruce Harrell, former acting mayor (2017), former president of the Seattle City Council (2016–2020), former city council-member (2008–2016; 2016–2020), candidate for mayor in 2013
Andrew Grant Houston, renter, small business owner, and activist
Arthur K. Langlie, businessman and grandson of former mayor of Seattle and governor of Washington Arthur B. Langlie
Stan Lippman, disbarred attorney and perennial candidate
Don L. Rivers, King County Metro worker
Lance Randall, executive director of Southeast Effective Development Seattle
Casey Sixkiller, deputy mayor of Seattle
Omari Tahir-Garrett, activist and candidate for Seattle City Council District 2 in 2019
Bobby Tucker, author

Withdrew
Jenny Durkan, incumbent mayor

Declined
 Gordon McHenry Jr., president and CEO of the United Way of King County
Cary Moon, activist, urban planner, and runner-up for mayor in 2017
Teresa Mosqueda, city councillor (endorsed Lorena Gonzalez)
Joe Nguyen, state senator (running for King County Executive)
Nikkita Oliver, Attorney, community activist and candidate for mayor in 2017 (running for Seattle City Council)
Rebecca Saldaña, state senator (endorsed Lorena Gonzalez)
Girmay Zahilay, member of the King County Council

Endorsements

Polling
Graphical summary

Results
By August 6, Echohawk, Farrell, and Houston had all conceded, and Harrell and González were viewed as the winners of the primary.

General election

Candidates
Lorena González, city council president
Bruce Harrell, former city council president

Endorsements
Endorsements in bold were made after the primary election.

Polling
Graphical summary

Results

See also
2021 Seattle City Attorney election
2021 Seattle City Council election

Notes

Partisan clients

References

External links
 Official campaign websites
 Doctor Bliss for Mayor of Seattle
 Colleen Echohawk for Mayor 
Jessyn Farrell for Mayor 
Lorena Gonzalez for Mayor
Bruce Harrell for Mayor
Andrew Grant Houston for Mayor 
William Kopatich for Mayor 
Art Langlie for Mayor 
Lance Randall for Mayor 
Casey Sixkiller for Mayor

Mayoral elections in Seattle
Seattle
Seattle mayoral